Rankwitz is a municipality in the Vorpommern-Greifswald district, in Mecklenburg-Vorpommern, Germany.

The economy of Rankwitz depends on tourism. There are many summer homes. Attractions include boating, fishing, and a historical museum.

References 

Vorpommern-Greifswald